Christopher Rejean Brown (born April 17, 1981) is a former American football running back in the National Football League (NFL). He was drafted by the Tennessee Titans in the third round of the 2003 NFL Draft. He played college football at Colorado.

High school career
Brown was named Prep Football Report and Super Prep All-American, first-team All-State, and Daily Herald first-team All-Area as senior at Naperville North High School in Naperville, Illinois, rushing for 1,250 yards and 15 touchdowns. He rushed for 2,300 yards and 30 touchdowns in his career at Naperville North, where he played with future Titans teammate Justin McCareins, as well as former Houston Texans defensive back Glenn Earl.

College career
Brown was recruited by Gary Barnett at Northwestern University and signed with NU under new coach Randy Walker after Barnett took the Colorado head coaching job. Unhappy with being switched to receiver, Brown left Northwestern after the 1999 season and played a year at Fort Scott Junior College before transferring again to the University of Colorado. At Colorado, Barnett provided him an opportunity to become one of the school's all-time leading rushers, including a school record 6 TDs against Nebraska in 2001 during his sophomore season. Brown's success continued into 2002, playing himself into a dark-horse Heisman Trophy candidate, before a late-season injury derailed his season and caused him to miss 2 and a half games. To most Colorado fans' dismay, Brown elected to skip his senior season and enter the NFL draft.

Professional career

Tennessee Titans
Brown was drafted by the Tennessee Titans in the 3rd round of the 2003 NFL Draft, with the 93rd overall selection.  As a rookie in 2003, Brown was not available to play during the preseason and five regular season games due to a hamstring injury. Although being behind two other backs, Brown averaged 3.9 yards per carry on 56 carries totaling 221 yards, the Titans' team high for the 2003 season.  He also performed very well in the playoffs.

At the beginning of the 2004 season, Brown was promoted to starting running back due to the absence of Eddie George in the Titans' lineup. He had a strong start, and finished the season with 1,067 yards, but several injuries forced him to miss significant time and also affected his play.  He led the NFL in Yards per carry in 2004.

In January 2005, Brown underwent successful surgery on both ankles.  In 2005, Brown ran for 851 yards.  Brown has been criticized in the past for running too upright and not running as powerfully as other backs his size.  In 2006, the Titans drafted LenDale White, a more traditional power runner, coupled with the emergence of Travis Henry, Brown was deactivated for several games during the 2006 season. Brown completed his contract with the Titans before leaving as a free agent to sign with the Houston Texans.

Brown rushed for a career-high 175 yards against the Jacksonville Jaguars on September 9, 2007.

Houston Texans
On March 13, 2008, Brown was signed by the Houston Texans to a two-year deal worth $3.6 million, including an $800,000 signing bonus. Brown played well for the Texans, but his Week 3 fumble, his only of the season, against the Jacksonville Jaguars cost the team a chance to tie a game and force overtime.  He also was intercepted on a halfback pass that was a poorly conceived play. Brown completed his two-year contract with the Texans.

Personal life

Brown is the younger brother of Levelle Brown, fullback formerly of the Chicago Rush of the Arena Football League. Chris has a younger sister named LaShawndra Brown who played Division III basketball. Chris lives in Houston with his wife and three children.

References

External links
 Houston Texans bio
 Tennessee Titans bio

Living people
1981 births
African-American players of American football
American football running backs
Northwestern Wildcats football players
Colorado Buffaloes football players
Tennessee Titans players
Houston Texans players
Players of American football from Illinois
Sportspeople from Naperville, Illinois
People from Winfield, Illinois
Sportspeople from the Chicago metropolitan area
21st-century African-American sportspeople
20th-century African-American people